Vasilios Bletsas (born 3 September 1975) is a retired Greek football defender.

References

1975 births
Living people
Greek footballers
PAS Giannina F.C. players
Kalamata F.C. players
Xanthi F.C. players
A.P.O. Akratitos Ano Liosia players
Digenis Akritas Morphou FC players
Acharnaikos F.C. players
Koropi F.C. players
Anagennisi Karditsa F.C. players
Doxa Kranoula F.C. players
Super League Greece players
Cypriot First Division players
Association football defenders
Greek expatriate footballers
Expatriate footballers in Cyprus
Greek expatriate sportspeople in Cyprus
Footballers from Ioannina